The Sicilian wolf (Canis lupus cristaldii) is an extinct subspecies of the gray wolf that was endemic to Sicily. It was paler than the mainland Italian wolf and comparable in size to the extant Arabian wolf and extinct Japanese wolf. The subspecies reportedly went extinct due to human persecution in the 1920s, though there were several possible sightings up to the 1970s. It was identified as a distinct subspecies in 2018 through morphological examinations of the few remaining mounted specimens and skulls, as well as mtDNA analyses.

Description
The Sicilian wolf was a slender, short-legged subspecies with light, tawny coloured fur. The dark band present on the forelimbs of the mainland Italian wolf are absent or poorly defined in the Sicilian wolf. Measurements taken from mounted museum specimens show that adults had a mean head to body length of 105.4 cm and a shoulder height of 54.6 cm, thus making them slightly smaller than the mainland Italian wolf, which measures 105.8-109.1 cm long and 65–66.9 cm high at the shoulder.

History
The Sicilian wolf likely entered Sicily via a land bridge that formed 21,500-20,000 years ago. Its decline likely began during the late Norman period, when its ungulate prey went extinct. The subspecies went extinct during the 20th century, but the exact date is unknown. It is generally thought that the last wolf was killed in 1924 near Bellolampo, though there are reports of further kills between 1935 and 1938, all in the vicinity of Palermo. Several sightings are also reported from 1960 and 1970.

In 2018, an examination of the holotype – a mounted specimen and its skull stored at the Museo di Storia Naturale di Firenze – and three others confirmed the morphological distinctiveness of the Sicilian wolf, and an examination of the mtDNA extracted from the teeth of several skulls showed that the subspecies possessed a unique haplotype, distinct from that of the Italian wolf.

In 2019, an mDNA study indicated that the Sicilian wolf and the Italian wolf were closely related and formed an "Italian clade" that was basal to all other modern wolves except for the Himalayan wolf and the now-extinct Japanese wolf. The study indicates that a genetic divergence occurred between the two lineages 13,400 years ago. This timing is compatible with the existence of the latest land bridge between Sicily and southwestern tip of Italy, which flooded at the end of the Late Pleistocene to form the Messina Strait.

Another study in 2019 confirmed that this wolf was genetically related to Italian wolves, Late Pleistocene wolves, and one specimen possessed a "wolf-like" mtDNA haplotype not detected before.

Cultural significance
According to Angelo De Gubernatis, superstitions about wolves were common in nineteenth-century Sicily. It was believed that the head of a wolf increased the courage of those who wore it, while in the province of Girgenti children wore wolf skin shoes to grow up as strong and combative adults.

References

Extinct canines
Mammal extinctions since 1500
Subspecies of Canis lupus
Wolves
Mammals described in 2018
Species made extinct by deliberate extirpation efforts
Endemic fauna of Italy